Brighton le Sands can refer to the following locations:

Brighton-le-Sands, Merseyside, England
Brighton-Le-Sands, New South Wales, Australia